Raymond Knowles (born 30 September 1952 in Willesden, London Borough of Brent) is an English former professional footballer who played in the Football League for Wimbledon as a forward.

References

1952 births
Living people
Footballers from Willesden
English footballers
Association football forwards
Southall F.C. players
Wimbledon F.C. players
Tooting & Mitcham United F.C. players
Wealdstone F.C. players
Burnham F.C. players
Hayes F.C. players
English Football League players
National League (English football) players